The Virginia Beach Convention Center is a large convention center located in Virginia Beach, Virginia. It opened in 2005, and is the largest building in the city of Virginia Beach by its total site area.

It has over 150,012 square feet of exhibit space and its exhibit hall can seat up to 11,840 people with theater seating. It has over 31,029 square feet of ballroom space and can seat up to 2,000 people with banquet seating and 3,108 with theater seating. It also has 26 meeting rooms with 28,929 square feet of meeting space between its two stories. The convention center also has a large 150-foot tower on its east side that has four floors with a large board room, VIP lounge, coffee bar and observation deck.

The convention center was designed by Skidmore, Owings & Merrill LLP and built by Turner Construction Company with a construction cost of $207 million. The convention center has won many awards including the Innovative Design in Engineering and Architecture with Structural Steel National Award from the American Institute of Steel Construction (2008), the Virginia Green Certification from the Virginia Department of Environmental Equality (2007), the Prime Site Award from Facilities & Destinations Magazine, the Public Works Project of the Year Award from the American Public Works Association, and the Best Institutional Public Building: First Honor Award from the Hampton Roads Association for Commercial Real Estate (2006).

Virginia Beach Arena 

The Virginia Beach Arena is a proposed multi-purpose entertainment and sports arena in Virginia Beach that is supposed to be built adjacent to the Virginia Beach Convention Center. The arena will have an approximate size of 500,000 square feet with a seating capacity of 18,000. It will anchor the City’s entertainment and arts district and be one block from Interstate-264 with multiple access points. The Virginia Beach Arena will be designed to host a wide array of events, from major concerts to ice shows, trade shows to monster truck rallies, and circuses to sporting events. However, it will also include NCAA/NBA/NHL-ready core features to enable future support of collegiate tournaments and a professional sports franchise.

Graduations 
All of Virginia Beach's high schools under the Virginia Beach City Public Schools district have held their graduations each year at the Virginia Beach Convention Center since 2008.

See also 
 List of convention centers in the United States
 List of convention and exhibition centers
 Virginia Beach, Virginia

References 

Convention centers in Virginia
Indoor arenas in Virginia